Ramone McKenzie (born 15 November 1990) is a Jamaican sprinter who specialises in the 100 and 200 metres. He turned professional on 2 November 2009, now being trained by American coach Lance Brauman. He is also a young entrepreneur who owns multiple small business for example Di Cave Purified water, Foodiezja Catering and Several others.

Career

He started his international career at the 2006 CARIFTA Games in the youth category (U-17) winning an individual silver medal in 200 metres, and two gold medals as member of the 4 × 100 m and 4 × 400 m relay teams. 
He was part of the Jamaican team at the 2009 World Championships in Athletics and participated in the 200 metres, but did not make it into the quarterfinals.

Personal best

Achievements

References

External links
 

1990 births
Living people
People from Saint Catherine Parish
Jamaican male sprinters
Athletes (track and field) at the 2010 Commonwealth Games
Commonwealth Games competitors for Jamaica